Air gap may refer to:

Science and technology
 Air gap (plumbing), the vertical space between the water outlet and the flood level of a fixture
 Air gap (networking), physical isolation from external computer networks
 IBM airgap, a technique invented by IBM for fabricating vacuum pockets in integrated circuits
 Air gap, in a magnetic circuit, used in inductors and transformers
 Air gap, the space between magnetic pole pieces in which a voice coil operates
 Air gaps, the use of air-filled or vacuum pockets as a replacement for low-κ dielectrics in integrated circuits

Other uses
 Mid-Atlantic gap, a geographic area not covered by allied air support during the World War II Battle of the Atlantic

See also
 Aire Gap, a geographical feature in the Pennines, England